Ahmad bin Abdullah Humaid Belhoul Al Falasi (Arabic: أحمد بن عبدالله حميد بالهول الفلاسي; born 24 November 1977) is the Minister of Education in the United Arab Emirates. He has been holding this position since 22 May 2022. He is the former Minister of State for Higher Education and former Minister of State for Entrepreneurship and SMEs.

Education 
Al Falasi holds a Ph.D. from Sir John Monash University in Australia, an M.Sc. from the University of Melbourne, and a B.Sc. in Telecommunications Engineering from Khalifa University.

Career 
He has worked for McKinsey & Company. He was Chief Executive Officer at Masdar, Executive Director of Strategy and Tourism Sector Development at Dubai’s Department of Tourism and Commerce Marketing, and Vice President of the Industry Unit of Mubadala Development Company.

He was Minister of State for Higher Education from February 2016 to July 2020. In 2017, the ministry became the Ministry of State for Higher Education and Advanced Skills. On 5 July 2020, he was appointed as Minister of State for Entrepreneurship and SMEs.

He is a member of the board of the National Central Cooling Company PJSC (Tabreed), chairman of the Federal Authority for Human Resources, chairman of the UAE Space Agency (since June 2017), a columnist at Arab News, and chairman of the General Authority of Sports since Jan. 2021. He also represents the space sector in the National Science, Technology and Innovation Committee.

While Al Falasi was Minister of State for Higher Education and Advanced Skills and chairman of the UAE Space Agency, the UAE’s Mars orbiter Misbar Al Amal was developed and launched on 19 July 2020 as part of the Emirates Mars Mission.

See also 
 Cabinet of the United Arab Emirates 
 List of Emiratis 
 House of Al Falasi

References 

Government ministers of the United Arab Emirates
Year of birth missing (living people)
Living people
Place of birth missing (living people)
20th-century Arabs